Baseball Night in America is an American television presentation of Major League Baseball (MLB) games produced by Fox Sports for the Fox network.

Fox's coverage includes 17 weeks worth of coverage as of 2022. Coverage usually includes 2 to 4 separate games all starting at 7PM ET, local affiliates air the game of most interest to their audience.

History
While Fox has aired Fox Saturday Baseball games since 1996, Fox only began using the Baseball Night in America branding in 2012. In the inaugural season, the Baseball Night in America branding was used for games from May 26 to July 7.

Until 2021 (although it still airs currently), Baseball Night in America aired every Saturday from the last week in May to the second week in July. Beginning with the 2019 season, late season Fox Saturday Baseball games moved from the afternoon to prime time. therefore  a separate section of games was added for September. Some of these September games aired on Thursday night as Thursday Night Baseball.

Because of the COVID-19 pandemic delaying the 2020 season, Fox Saturday Baseball returned to airing some afternoon Saturday games. Fox aired Saturday primetime games between July 25 and August 1, and between September 12 and September 26, as well as on August 15. Fox returned to their 2019 scheduling for the 2021 season.

For the 2022 season, Fox aired Baseball Night in America games every Saturday from May 26 to September 10, as well as on Saturday, October 1. Fox also aired two other weeks of prime time games in September as Thursday Night Baseball games. This is the result of Fox increasing the amount of games they air on broadcast television in their new television contract, as well as a side effect of the loss of Fox's Thursday night NFL games outside of local syndication.

On air staff

Play-by-play commentators
 Joe Davis (Lead)
 Adam Amin
 Aaron Goldsmith
 Don Orsillo
 Len Kasper
 Wayne Randazzo

Color commentators
 John Smoltz (Lead)
 Eric Karros
 A. J. Pierzynski
 Tom Verducci
 Mark Sweeney

Field reporters
 Ken Rosenthal
 Tom Verducci

Studio
 Kevin Burkhardt (Host)
 Frank Thomas (Analyst)
 Dontrelle Willis (Analyst)
 Nick Swisher (Analyst)
 Cameron Maybin (Analyst)

Ratings

2020 season

2021 season

2022 season

See also
 Major League Baseball on Fox
 Major League Baseball on FS1
 Thursday Night Baseball

References

External links
 

 
2012 American television series debuts
2010s American television series
2020s American television series
Fox Broadcasting Company original programming
Fox Sports original programming
Sports telecast series
Major League Baseball on television